The Wilno school massacre was a school shooting that occurred on 6 May 1925 at the Joachim Lelewel High School in Wilno, Poland (now Vilnius, Lithuania). During the final exams, at about 11 a.m., at least two eighth-grade students attacked the board of examiners with revolvers and hand grenades, killing two students, one teacher, and themselves.

It was the first-ever school shooting that took place in Poland, preceding the Inowrocław school shooting in April 1936, the Kluczbork School of Economic shooting on December 16, 2001 and the Brześć Kujawski school shooting on May 27, 2019.

Attack
Various accounts of the incident were reported by the newspapers worldwide. That the students were in possession of military grade weapons suggests that they might have been in contact with the illegal Soviet agents deployed to Poland for sabotage and espionage operations.

The article in British daily Times stated that two students, identified as Stanisław Ławrynowicz and Janusz Obrąbalski, per Polish sources, were involved in the incident. According to the article, Ławrynowicz, who was a member of an organisation that supported Józef Piłsudski, began shooting at the teachers with a revolver after being told that he had failed exams, whereupon other students tried to disarm him. Ławrynowicz then dropped a hand grenade which killed him and several other students. Immediately after this Obrapalski, his friend, rose from his place and fired several shots at the teachers, wounding a professor and several students, before throwing a hand grenade, which failed to explode. He then committed suicide. Including the perpetrators themselves, five persons were killed, one of them a professor. Six students, as well as the headmaster, were wounded.

According to an article in the Neue Freie Presse three students carried out the attack, who were identified as Stanislaus Lawrynowicz, Janusz Obrembalski and Thaddäus Domanski, who was also named Ormanski in other reports. The newspaper reported that Lawrynowicz fired several shots at principal Bieganski, after most of the students had refused to take part at the exams, while at the same time Obrembalski began shooting at the teachers. Domanski then tried to throw a bomb into the group of teachers, which slipped out of his hands and exploded at his feet, killing himself, as well as the two other attackers, and a fourth student named Zagorski. Principal Bieganski was mortally wounded in the attack and Professor Jankowski, as well as seven other students were gravely injured.

An investigation revealed that the students had established a Communist youth organization to counter the principal's strict management of the school. The members of this organization had met one day before the exams in a tavern to discuss their further actions.

However, the most likely motive was the bad mental state of both perpetrators, who were unable to adapt to the school lifestyle after the war experiences (Ławrynowicz took an active part in the Polish-Soviet War, while Obrapalski lost all his family possessions as a result). A bomb was later found in one classroom, large enough to blow up the school building.

See also
 Vera Kharuzhaya, Soviet agent deployed to Poland for sabotage and espionage operations during the interbellum
 List of school-related attacks

References

External links
 Baisus atsitikimas lenkų gimnazijoj, Vilniaus Aidas (May 7, 1925) (p. 4)
 Nelaime gimnazijoj, Vilniaus Aidas, (May 9, 1925) (p. 4)
 Stupéfiant attentat dans un lycée de Vilna, Le Figaro (May 8, 1925)
 Anschlag von Gymnasiasten, Freiburger Zeitung (May 8, 1925)
 Die Wilnaer Gymnasiasten-Revolte, Neues 8 Uhr Blatt (May 7, 1925)
 Ein weiteres Todesopfer des Attentats im Wilnaer Gymnasium, Neue Freie Presse (May 8, 1925)
 Bombenattentat von Schülern in einem polnischen Gymnasium, Prager Tagblatt (May 7, 1925)
 Schreckenstaten im Wilnaer Gymnasium, Reichspost (May 7, 1925)
 Attentat in einer Wilnaer Schule, Wiener Zeitung (May 8, 1925)
 Das Attentat im Wilnaer Gymnasium, Wiener Zeitung (May 9, 1925)
 Ein Racheakt polnischer Gymnasiasten, Coburger Zeitung (May 8, 1925)
 Polish Students, The Argus (Australia) (May 9, 1925)

School massacres
Mass murder in 1925
Massacres in 1925
School bombings
1925 in Poland
Deaths by firearm in Poland
Murder in Poland
History of Vilnius
School shootings in Europe
May 1925 events
1925 murders in Poland
Massacres in Poland